Adamant is a poetic term used to refer to any especially hard substance.

Adamant may also refer to:

Arts and entertainment
 Adam Adamant Lives!, a BBC television series in the 1960s
 Adamant (album), an album by the German band Stahlmann
 Adam Ant (born 1954), New Romantic singer of the 1980s

Ships
 HMS Adamant, several ships of the Royal Navy
 USS Adamant (AMc-62), a 1941 Accentor-class minesweeper in the US Navy during World War II
 Adamant (ship), several merchant vessels

Other uses
 Adamant, Vermont, an unincorporated community in the US
 Adamant Co., Ltd., a Japanese company

See also
 Adamantane, a bulky hydrocarbon
 Adamantium, a fictional metal alloy appearing in American comic books published by Marvel Comics
 Adamantine (disambiguation)
 Adamantius (disambiguation)